The 2016 Big East Conference men's soccer season was the four season for the newly realigned Big East Conference. Including the history of the original Big East Conference, this was the 21st season of men's soccer under the "Big East Conference" name.

The Georgetown Hoyas are both the defending regular season and conference tournament champions.

Changes from 2015 

 None

Teams

Stadiums and locations

Regular season

Results

Rankings

Postseason

Big East tournament

NCAA tournament

All-Big East awards and teams

† Unanimous selection

See also 
 2016 NCAA Division I men's soccer season
 2016 Big East Men's Soccer Tournament
 2016 Big East Conference women's soccer season

References 

 
2016 NCAA Division I men's soccer season